That's My Jam is a British television game show based on the American game show of the same name. It premiered on 17 December 2022 on BBC One and is hosted by British comedian Mo Gilligan.

Format 
The game features celebrity teams competing in music-themed challenges, such as "Mixtape Medley Showdown", "Slay It, Don't Spray It", "Wheel of Musical Impressions" and "Take On Mo".

Production 
In December 2021, it was reported that the BBC would be developing a British adaptation of That's My Jam with Mo Gilligan as host. In August 2022, the series was officially announced, with filming taking place in Los Angeles. In December 2022, it was announced that the show would premiere on BBC One on 17 December 2022.

Episodes

Reception 
The show received poor reception from audiences and critics. Jack Seale of The Guardian gave the show two-out-of-five stars, calling the show "awkward". Michael Hogan of The Daily Telegraph gave the show one star out of five, criticizing the lack of British participants and calling it "embarrassing" and "clattering". Katie Timms of The Plymouth Herald gathered audience reactions which mainly gave negative feedback, some deemed it as "the worst programme on Saturday night television".

References

External links 
 
 
 

2020s British game shows
2022 British television series debuts
BBC television game shows
British music television shows
British television series based on American television series
English-language television shows